L. Scott Caldwell (born Laverne Scott; April 17, 1950) is an American actress perhaps best known for her roles as Deputy U.S. Marshall Erin Poole in The Fugitive (1993) and Rose on the television series Lost.

Early life 
Born the middle child in Chicago, Illinois, to working-class parents, Laverne Scott grew up in the Woodlawn neighborhood on the South Side. At a high enrollment elementary school, she attended the morning session, and her older siblings went to school in the afternoon. When the school released her at noon she was escorted to a neighborhood theater where she was minded by a friend of her mother. While attending Hyde Park High School, she joined the drama club.

Her class went to see a performance of A Day of Absence, featuring Douglas Turner Ward, a co-founder of The Negro Ensemble Company. It was the first time she saw professional black actors on stage. After graduating high school in 1967, she attended Northwestern University. She left after one year and went to work full-time as an operator at Illinois Bell. She got married and had a son. She transferred her credits to Loyola University-Chicago and earned a bachelor's degree in Theater Arts and Communications.

Career 
Caldwell planned on a teaching career and taught at Chicago High School of the Performing Arts. She also worked a year for the Chicago Council on Fine Arts as an artist-in-residence. While in Chicago Caldwell performed in local theatrical productions at the Body Politic, Court Theater, and Eleventh Street Theater. She went to New York in 1978 to audition for Uta Hagen's school HB Studio. While waiting to audition she saw an ad for The Negro Ensemble Company. After her audition at Hagen's school, she took the subway to the NEC.

Caldwell was initially rebuffed by the person who interviewed her but she insisted on meeting with Ward. She used the three pieces she performed at her audition for Hagen. She was accepted by both Hagen and Ward. During her first season at NEC Caldwell performed in several plays. One of those plays, Home, by Samm Art Williams, took her to Broadway's Cort Theatre in 1980. The play was critically acclaimed and earned a Tony Award nomination for Charles Brown. After Home closed Caldwell worked in several regional theater productions including Boesman and Lena at Milwaukee Repertory Theatre and A Raisin in the Sun at Studio Arena Theatre in Buffalo, New York.

In December 1984, while working in Play of Giants, Caldwell was struck by a car while hailing a cab on Columbus Avenue in New York. She suffered a severe back injury and was unable to work for nearly two years. Her first audition after her recovery was for August Wilson's Joe Turner's Come and Gone. Her performance as Bertha Holly earned her a 1988 Tony Award. Soon after winning the Tony, she moved to southern California to work in television and film. She is extremely busy, working in several cities in the U.S., Canada, and South Africa, and continues to work in theater. She returned to Broadway in 1997 as the lead in Neil Simon's short-lived Proposals. After Proposals closed Caldwell performed the role of Leah, Little Augie's sister, in New York City Center's "Encores! Great American Musicals in Concert" production of St. Louis Woman.

In 2006, she made her Goodman Theatre debut in Regina Taylor's The Dreams of Sarah Breedlove. In 2011, she took on the role of Lena Younger in the Ebony Repertory Theatre production of the Lorraine Hansberry classic A Raisin in the Sun. The play was directed by Phylicia Rashad. Caldwell, along with the entire cast, was nominated for the LA Stage Alliance 2011 Ovation Award for her work as Lena, for which she won the 2011 Los Angeles Drama Critics Circle Award.

Caldwell is an active member of Unite For Strength, the Screen Actors Guild coalition in favor of joining with AFTRA. On September 19, 2008, she won a seat as an alternate on the national board of directors and the Hollywood division board of directors. Caldwell was elected to a second one-year term on September 24, 2009. She served on the Seniors, Legislative, Women, Holiday Host, Honors and Tributes, and EEOC committees. In September 2010, she was elected to a one-year term on the national board of directors. She served as the national chair of the Women's committee. In 2011, Caldwell is on the SAG national board of directors ballot for a fourth consecutive year. She won a three-year term on the national and Hollywood boards. She will serve as national chair of Women, and Healthcare Safetynet committees.

In 2016, she was part of the six-part PBS Civil War drama miniseries Mercy Street.

Personal life 
In her early twenties, Scott married John Caldwell and had a son, Ominara. She was divorced in the early 1980s and was married again (on her birthday) in 2004 to artist/photographer/director Dasal Banks. Banks suffered from cancer and died in May 2005. Caldwell completed her husband's final film, My Brothers and Me, a documentary created to raise awareness about prostate cancer among black men.

Caldwell gives lectures and appears on panels concerning African American actors. In 2007, she participated in tributes to August Wilson at Goodman Theatre in conjunction with Congo Square Theatre Company in Chicago, and at St. Louis Black Repertory Company. In June 2008, she participated in the NAACP Theatre Awards Festival Actors on Acting panel. In June 2009, Caldwell moderated a panel of actors, directors, and casting directors discussing African American Images in Hollywood. In February 2010, she directed a staged reading of Standing On My Sisters' Shoulders for the Los Angeles chapter of Actors Equity Association.

Film

Television

Theatre 
 2017 Gem of the Ocean as Aunt Ester Tyler
 2014 What I Learned In Paris as Eve Madison
 2014 The Wife's Story as She
 2011 A Raisin in the Sun as Lena Younger
 2011 The Circle as Donna
 2009 Reverse Transcription Staged Reading as Ottoline
 2006 The Dreams of Sarah Breedlove as Sarah Breedlove / Madam C.J. Walker
 2000–2005 Going to St. Ives (radio broadcast and recording) as May N'Kame
 1998 St. Louis Woman as Leah
 1997 Proposals as Clemma Diggins
 1997 Macbeth as Lady Macbeth
 1995 American Medea as Medea
 1991 The Piano Lesson as Berniece
 1990 From the Mississippi Delta as Miss Rosebud / Brother Pastor
 1987–1988 Joe Turner's Come and Gone as Bertha Holly
 1987 A Month of Sundays as Understudy Mrs. Baker
 1986 Elegies for the Fallen Staged Reading
 1984 A Play of Giants as Ambassador
 1983 About Heaven & Earth as Black Woman, The Redeemer / Raimy, Nightline
 1982 A Raisin in the Sun as Ruth Younger
 1982 Colored Peoples Time as Catherine / Addie / Nadine / Ida
 1982 Boesman and Lena as Lena
 1980–1981 Home as Pattie Mae Wells / Woman One (Broadway debut)
 1979 A Season to Unravel as Afrodite
 1979 Plays From Africa – Everyman & The Imprisonment of Obatala
 1979 Old Phantoms as Ruth
 1978Daughters of the Mock as Gail
 1977 The Thesmophoriazousae as Sosie (Chicago – Court Theatre)
 1975 The Other Cinderella (Chicago – Club Misty)
 1974 No Place to be Somebody: A Black-Black Comedy as Cora Beasley (Loyola University student production)
 A Raisin in the Sun Travis Younger (Hyde Park High School student production)

Director 
 2009 My Brothers and Me Documentary
 2010 Standing On My Sisters' Shoulders Staged Reading

Commercials 
 1989 The United Negro College Fund – Little Brother as Mother
 1992 McDonald's – Grapevine as Calvin's Mother

Radio 
 1982 WBAI – Reena by Paule Marshall as The Narrator

Awards and nominations 
Awards
 2011 Los Angeles Drama Critics Circle Award for Lead Performance and Ensemble Performance – A Raisin in the Sun
 2006 BTAA Award for Best leading actress in a play – The Dreams of Sarah Breedlove
 2005 Obie Award for Performance in a play – Going to St. Ives
 1998 Helen Hayes Award for Supporting actress in a non-resident production – Proposals
 1997 Drama-Logue Award for Performance in a play – Proposals
 1990 Drama-Logue Award for Ensemble performance – From The Mississippi Delta
 1988 Tony Award for Featured actress in a play – Joe Turner's Come & Gone

Nominations
 2011 Ovation Award for Best Acting Ensemble in a Play – A Raisin in the Sun
 2007 Gemini Award (Canadian television) for Best actress in a guest performance – Jozi-H
 2005 Outer Critics Circle Award for Outstanding actress in a play – Going to St. Ives
 1998 FANY (FAns of NY Theatre) Award for Outstanding actress in a play – Proposals

Further reading 
Chicago Defender "Loyola Opens Season With Versatile Seasoned Cast", October 5, 1974, p. A5
 Chicago Defender "Other Cinderella Premieres at Club Misty", August 7, 1975, p. 15
 Kuchwara, Michael St. Louis Post-Dispatch Everyday Magazine "Tony Winner Knew It In Her Heart", July 1, 1988, p. 8F
 Weiss, Hedy Chicago Sun-Times, July 14, 1988, p. 39
 Mitchell, Ophelia DeVore The Columbus Times "Tony Award Winning Actress Puts Her Philosophy of Enriching Others' Lives to Practice" vol. XXVII issue 35, August 28, 1988, p. A1
 Jackson, Caroline Black Masks "L. Scott Caldwell: Laughter in One Hand; The Tony in the Other" vol. 4 issue 9, August 31, 1988, p. 4
 Bogle, Donald Black Arts Annual 1987–1988, 1989
 Hay, Samuel A. African American Theatre – An Historical and Critical Analysis, 1994, pgs. 142, 146, 158, 159, 161, 169
 Isherwood, Charles Variety, "Proposals", July 26, 1997
 Flatow, Sheryl Playbill, "Neil Simon Tells Love Stories in Proposals", November 18, 1997
 Kilian, Michael Chicago Tribune, "Serious Simon – Play Has Its Critics, But Its Leading Actresses Find Acclaim", November 30, 1997, Arts & Entertainment, p. 10
 Kuchwara, Michael The Plain Dealer "Sweet Role Entices Actress to Simon Play: Maid a Major Role in Proposals", December 14, 1997, Arts section p. 101
 Simon, Neil The Play Goes On: A Memoir, 2002 p. 318
 Oldenburg, Ann USA Today "Love Is No Longer Color-coded on TV", December 20, 2005
 Pietrusiak, Leah Time Out Chicago "5 Minutes With L. Scott Caldwell", June 22–28, 2006
 Woulfe, Molly The Times of Northwest Indiana "Lost Actress Recaps Life on the Island", June 30, 2006
 Lost: The Official Magazine "By The Fire: L. Scott Caldwell & Sam Anderson", Issue #5, July/August 2006, p. 30
 Vaughn, Kenya St. Louis American "Black Rep Goes Beyond August Wilson", March 28, 2007
 Hill, Anthony D. Historical Dictionary of African American Theater, 2009, p. 81
 Cairns, Bryan Lost The Official Magazine "By The Fire: Revolution Resolution", Issue #24, 2009 Yearbook Sep/Oct 2009, p. 70
 Donloe, Darlene LA Stage Times "Phylicia Rashad Takes the Direct Approach", March 23, 2011
 McCollester, Maggie Equity News "L. Scott Caldwell Welcomes New Members" Vol. 96 number 8, October/November 2011, p. 8

References

External links 

1950 births
Living people
Actresses from Chicago
American film actresses
African-American actresses
Tony Award winners
American stage actresses
American television actresses
20th-century American actresses
21st-century American actresses
Hyde Park Academy High School alumni
20th-century African-American women
20th-century African-American people
21st-century African-American women
21st-century African-American people